Great Easton may refer to two places in England:

Great Easton, Essex
Great Easton, Leicestershire

See also
Great Eastern (disambiguation)